Fadillah Nur Rahman (born 10 February 2002) is an Indonesian professional footballer who plays as a defender or defensive midfielder for Liga 1 club Madura United.

Club career

Madura United
Fadillah signed with Madura United to play in the Indonesian Liga 1 for the 2020 season. This season was suspended on 27 March 2020 due to the COVID-19 pandemic. The season was abandoned and was declared void on 20 January 2021. He made his professional debut on 5 February 2022 in a match against Persela Lamongan at the Ngurah Rai Stadium, Denpasar.

Kalteng Putra (loan)
In 2021, Fadillah signed a contract with Indonesian Liga 2 club Kalteng Putra. He made his league debut on 10 November 2021 in a match against Persewar Waropen at the Batakan Stadium, Balikpapan.

Career statistics

Club

Notes

Honours

International
Indonesia U-16
 JENESYS Japan-ASEAN U-16 Youth Football Tournament: 2017
 AFF U-16 Youth Championship: 2018

References

External links
 Fadillah Nur Rahman at Soccerway
 Fadillah Nur Rahman at Liga Indonesia

2002 births
Living people
Indonesian footballers
Indonesia youth international footballers
Liga 1 (Indonesia) players
Liga 2 (Indonesia) players
Madura United F.C. players
Kalteng Putra F.C. players
Association football defenders
People from Padang Pariaman Regency
Sportspeople from West Sumatra